Shad Forsythe (born 8 June 1973) is an American soccer fitness coach who is fitness coach of Borussia Dortmund.

Career

In 2004, Forsythe was appointed fitness coach of Germany. In 2014, he was appointed fitness coach of Arsenal in England.

In 2022, he was appointed fitness coach of German club Borussia Dortmund after revising interest from Milan.

References

1973 births
American expatriate sportspeople in England
American expatriate sportspeople in Germany
American soccer players
Arsenal F.C. non-playing staff
Borussia Dortmund non-playing staff
Living people
Association football coaches